The constituency of Gloucestershire was a UK Parliamentary constituency. After it was abolished under the 1832 Electoral Reform Act, two new constituencies, West Gloucestershire and East Gloucestershire, were created.

Gloucestershire was a constituency of the House of Commons of the Parliament of England, then of the Parliament of Great Britain from 1707 to 1800 and of the Parliament of the United Kingdom from 1801 to 1832. It was represented by two Knights of the Shire.

Boundaries
The constituency consisted of the historic county of Gloucestershire, excluding the part of the city of Bristol in the geographical county. Bristol had the status of a county of itself after 1373. Although Gloucestershire contained a number of other parliamentary boroughs, each of which elected two MPs in its own right for part of the period when Gloucestershire was a constituency, these were not excluded from the county constituency. Owning property within such boroughs could confer a vote at the county election. This was not the case, though, for Bristol.

Members of Parliament
Roman numerals are used to differentiate MPs with the same name, who are not holders of a title with different succession numbers. It is not suggested that the people involved would have used Roman numerals in this way.

1290–1339

Constituency created (1290)

1340–1385

1386–1421
(Source: Roskell, 1992)

1422–1508

1509–1558
(Source: Bindoff (1982))

1559–1639

1640–1832

Notes:-
 1 Dutton was disabled from sitting for adhering to the King and joining the King's Oxford Parliament, c. 1644.
 2 Seymour was excluded from Parliament by the Army, c. 1648.
 3 Father of the Baynham Throckmorton elected in 1656 and 1664.
 4 Stooks Smith classifies Bromley-Chester as Tory in the 1776 by-election, but gives no label in subsequent elections.
 5 Stooks Smith classifies Berkeley as Whig in the 1776 by-election (which he lost), but gives no label in subsequent elections before the general election of 1790. Both Berkeley and Master are classified by party from 1790.

Elections

See also
List of former United Kingdom Parliament constituencies
Unreformed House of Commons

Sources
Cobbett's Parliamentary history of England, from the Norman Conquest in 1066 to the year 1803 (London: Thomas Hansard, 1808) 
 The House of Commons 1690-1715, by Eveline Cruickshanks, Stuart Handley and D.W. Hayton (Cambridge University Press 2002)
 The Parliaments of England by Henry Stooks Smith (1st edition published in three volumes 1844–50), second edition edited (in one volume) by F.W.S. Craig (Political Reference Publications 1973))

Roskell, J.S. (ed.), The History of Parliament; The House of Commons 1386-1421, 4 vols., Stroud, 1992. Vol.1, p. 398
Williams, W.R., Parliamentary History of the County of Gloucester, Hereford, 1898

References

Constituencies of the Parliament of the United Kingdom established in 1290
Constituencies of the Parliament of the United Kingdom disestablished in 1832
Parliamentary constituencies in South West England (historic)
Politics of Gloucestershire